St. Rose High School is a co-educational four-year Catholic high school in Belmar, in Monmouth County, New Jersey, United States. The school operates under the auspices of the Roman Catholic Diocese of Trenton. The school was founded in 1923 by the Parish of St. Rose and the Sisters of St. Joseph.

As of the 2019–20 school year, the school had an enrollment of 411 students and 52 classroom teachers (on an FTE basis), for a student–teacher ratio of 8.6:1. The school's student body was 90.5% (372) White, 4.6% (19) Hispanic 2.2% (9) Asian, 1.9% (8) Black and 0.7% (3) two or more races.

St. Rose High School has been accredited by AdvancED.

Athletics
The St. Rose High School Purple Roses compete in Division A Central of the Shore Conference, an athletic conference comprised of private and public high schools in Monmouth and Ocean counties along the Jersey Shore. The league operates under the jurisdiction of the New Jersey State Interscholastic Athletic Association (NJSIAA). With 339 students in grades 10–12, the school was classified by the NJSIAA for the 2019–20 school year as Non-Public B for most athletic competition purposes, which included schools with an enrollment of 37 to 366 students in that grade range (equivalent to Group II for public schools).

The school participates as the host school / lead agency in a joint ice hockey team with Donovan Catholic High School and Red Bank Catholic High School. The co-op program operates under agreements scheduled to expire at the end of the 2023–24 school year.

The school was recognized by the NJSIAA as the Group B winner of the Seventh Annual ShopRite Cup in 2009–10, based on the overall performances of the school's athletic teams which included first-place finishes in boys' cross country, boys' indoor track and field, girls' outdoor track and field and boys' outdoor track and field; second place in boys' soccer, third in girls' indoor track and field and baseball (tied), and fourth in boys' golf, plus bonus points for having no disqualifications for the fall season. The school was Group B winner of the ShopRite Cup for 2010–11, awarded for first-place finishes in girls' soccer and boys' soccer, second in boys' indoor group track and field, third in boys' cross country, girls' basketball (tied), girls' indoor group track and field, boys' outdoor track & field and boys' tennis (tied), and fourth in boys' golf plus bonus points for having no disqualifications for the fall and spring seasons.

The baseball team won the Non-Public Group C state championship in 1973 (defeating St. Patrick's High School in the tournament final), and won the Non-Public B state title in 1992 (vs. Essex Catholic High School), 2005 (vs. Morristown-Beard School), 2008 (vs. St. Mary High School of Rutherford) and 2009 (vs. Montclair Kimberley Academy). With three runs scored in the sixth inning, the 1973 team came back from a 1–0 deficit to finish the season with a 12–5 record after defeating St. Patrick's by a score of 3–2 in the Parochial C championship game. In 1992, the team finished with a 23–4 record after defeating Essex Catholic by a score of 12–4 in the Parochial C championship game. The 2005 team won the South Jersey Non-Public B state sectional title with a 10–3 win over St. Joseph High School of Hammonton, with nine of the runs coming with two outs in the sixth inning. The 2005 team won the Non-Public B state championship over Morristown-Beard School by a score of 4–0, with pitcher Anthony Ranaudo throwing a complete game two-hitter and hitting a first inning three-run home run that gave St. Rose all the runs it needed. The 2008 team won the Non-Public B title with an 8–4 win in the finals against St. Mary's.

The boys' basketball team won the Non-Public Group B state championship in 1949 (against runner-up Immaculate Conception High School of Montclair in the playoff final), 1962 (vs. Immaculate Conception of Montclair), 1963 (vs. Phillipsburg Catholic High School), 1966 (vs. Our Lady of the Valley High School) and 1977 (vs. Our Lady of the Valley). Bob Verga scored 26 points to lead the 1962 team to the Parochial B state title with a 63-31 team against Immaculate Conception. The 2002 boys' basketball team won the Parochial South B state sectional championship with a 67–46 win over Wildwood Catholic High School in the tournament final. The 2004 team repeated the victory in the South Parochial B state sectionals, taking the title with a 58–46 win over Wildwood Catholic. The greatest boys player in school history is Bob Verga, a prolific scorer at both St. Rose and Duke University who went on to play in the now-defunct ABA and hooked on to play in the NBA team post-merger. He set a state record with 1,033 points scored during his senior year at St. Rose and led his team to consecutive state championship in 1962 and in his senior year in 1963, when he scored the winning points in a game against Phillipsburg Catholic High School despite being triple teamed.

The boys' cross country team won the Non-Public Group B state championship in 1967, 1969, 1988, 2000, 2001 and 2009. The boys' cross country team was the subject of the 2007 book God on the Starting Line: The Triumph of a Catholic School Running Team and Its Jewish Coach by Marc Bloom.

The boys' soccer team won the Non-Public C state championship in 1973 (against runner-up St. Cecilia High School (New Jersey) in the tournament final), and won the Non-Public B title in 1975 (vs. Don Bosco Preparatory High School), 1977 (vs. Paterson Catholic High School) and 1978 (vs. Paterson Catholic) and 1988 (vs. St. Benedict's Preparatory School), and won the Non-Public A title in 1981 (vs. Delbarton School), 1985 (vs. Bergen Catholic High School), 1986 (vs. Don Bosco) and 2010 (vs. Oratory Preparatory School). The program's 10 state titles are tied for fifth-most in the state. The 1977 team finished the season with a record of 17-2-1 after a 6–3 win against Paterson Catholic in the Parochial B championship game. The 1981 team defeated Delbarton by a score of 2–0 in the Non-Public A championship game to finish the season 21-2-1. In 2002, the boys' soccer team took the South Parochial B state sectional championship with a 5–0 win against Wildwood Catholic High School.

The girls' basketball team won the Group II state championship in 1976 (against Lyndhurst High School in the playoff finals) and 1977 (vs. Union Catholic Regional High School), won the Non-Public Group A title in 1983 (over Paramus Catholic High School), 2012 (vs. Immaculate Heart Academy), 2018 (vs. Immaculate Heart) and 2019 (vs. Immaculate Heart), and the Group B titles in 1993 (against DePaul Catholic High School of Wayne), in 1998 (vs. Marist High School of Bayonne), 2000 (vs. Marist), 2014 (vs. Morris Catholic High School) and 2015 (vs. Immaculate Conception High School of Lodi). The program's 12 state titles are ranked second in the state. The 1977 team finished the season with a 29–1 record after winning the Group II state title with a victory against Union Catholic by a score of 58–36 in the tournament final. The 1993 team won the Parochial B title with a 66–48 victory against DePaul in the championship game. The team won the Parochial South B state sectional championship in 2000 with a 66–40 win over Sacred Heart High School in the tournament final. The 2004 won the South B state sectional title with a 47–36 win against Holy Spirit High School in the tournament final.

The girls' tennis team won the Non-Public B state championship in 1984 (vs. Pope John XXIII High School in the final match of the tournament) The team won the 2000 South B sectional state championship with a 4–1 win against Sacred Heart High School.

The girls' cross country team won the Non-Public Group B state championship in 1993, 1997-1999 and 2007.

The girls' spring / outdoor track team won the Non-Public Group B state championship in 1998.

The girls' soccer team won the Non-Public Group B state championship in 2010, defeating runner-up Morris Catholic High School in the finals.

The boys' track team won the Non-Public Group B spring / outdoor track state championship in 2010 and 2016.

The girls' track team won the indoor relay Non-Public Group B state championship in 2013 (as co-champion).

The boys' bowling team won the Group I state championship in 2018.

Notable alumni

 Nicole Atkins (born 1978), singer.
 Bill Carmody (born 1951), college basketball coach.
 Regina Egea, Chief of Staff to Governor Chris Christie.
 Marlene Lynch Ford (born 1954, class of 1972), politician, prosecutor and jurist who served in the New Jersey General Assembly from 1984 to 1992.
 Tim Hauser (1941-2014), founding member of pop-jazz quartet The Manhattan Transfer.
 Ken Lolla (born c. 1962, class of 1980), former head coach of the Louisville Cardinals men's soccer team, author and speaker who was a 1980 High School All-American for St. Rose.
 Tom McGowan (born 1959), actor.
 Anthony Ranaudo (born 1989), MLB pitcher for the Texas Rangers.
 Bob Verga (born 1945), former professional basketball player.
 Tommy West (1942–2021), record producer and singer-songwriter who co-founded The Criterions with Tim Hauser, a predecessor to The Manhattan Transfer.

References

External links
St. Rose High School

1923 establishments in New Jersey
Educational institutions established in 1923
Private high schools in Monmouth County, New Jersey
Roman Catholic Diocese of Trenton
Catholic secondary schools in New Jersey
Belmar, New Jersey